Cefuzonam (INN) is a second-generation cephalosporin antibiotic.

References 
 

Cephalosporin antibiotics
Thiadiazoles
Thiazoles